Michael Long is a former professional Magic: The Gathering player who was a high-profile figure on the Pro Tour in its formative years.

Magic: The Gathering 

Magic: The Gathering was released in 1993 and a Pro Tour launched the following year. Long proved to be an early celebrity champion. He was known for his charismatic persona, and often presented as a "villain" in the Magic tournaments. Long's first individual tournament win was at the Paris Pro Tour during the Magic: The Gathering Pro Tour season 1996–97. During the Paris tournament, Long debuted a "combination deck" called Prosperous Bloom that was notably the first successful combination deck in tournament-level play. During the last game of the finals, Long was playing against Mark Justice and faced losing when Justice played Coercion to find out Long was holding the only Drain Life in his deck (and his only way to win). Despite this, Justice pulled Cadaverous Bloom instead, thinking Long could get the Drain Life back with Elven Cache if allowed to generate the "cadaverous mana" for a large Prosperity. Little did he know Long had sideboarded them out (as he pointed out before draining Justice's life for a total of 44 points), Justice then conceded when Long asked him "if he needed to go through the motions" instead of watching the combo play out and fizzle. At the 1998 U.S. Nationals, Long was the subject of controversy over his potential act of cheating when a key card from his combo deck was found on Long's chair during a game. The head judge issued a match loss to Long, who went on to finish second in the tournament. Long won that year's Magic Invitational. The award was the chance to create a new card and inclusion in the card's art. That card, was printed in the Nemesis set.

By his retirement, Long had won a Pro Tour, a Grand Prix, and an Invitational and held the record for being on the most winning national teams and was in the top lifetime money winners. Long's legacy also included one of the first player teams, created while he was still in college. Subsequent Vintage combo decks that use tutoring to set up a Tendrils kill have retained the name although the original deck was rendered unplayable by restrictions. In 2005, former organizer Mark Rosewater nominated Long for the Hall of Fame. This ignited debates over Long's impact on the game. Rosewater wrote, "He was an early pioneer in deck design and had an influence on how deck building technology evolved. He was a tournament organizer. He wrote about the game." Others felt Long did not qualify his entry due to the playing controversies. During the Pro Tour Los Angeles in 2000, Long had been given a warning for improperly shuffling his deck. Darwin Kastle made a further error when he cut Long's deck instead of shuffling. During the US Nationals Draft Challenge held at United States Nationals in 2000, Long was disqualified without prize and given a one-month suspension for presenting a deck that was not sufficiently randomized.

Magic: The Gathering professional appearances

Early life, education, and career 
Long was born in Albany, New York and later lived in Gambrills, Maryland where he attended the Severn School. He attended college at James Madison University in Harrisonburg, Virginia. At James Madison, he was a varsity wrestler and played on the James Madison Dukes football team. He began competing at Magic: The Gathering tournaments in 1995.  After graduation, Long owned a game store called "The End" in Charlottesville and wrote strategy articles in addition to working on the professional tour. He began using Internet marketing for both his strategy articles and for card sales, and also started a search engine optimization business.

References

External links 
 

Living people
American Magic: The Gathering players
1974 births
Internet marketing people
Businesspeople from Albany, New York
21st-century American businesspeople
People from Franklin, Tennessee
James Madison University alumni
James Madison Dukes football players